Mount Drum is a stratovolcano in the Wrangell Mountains of east-central Alaska in the United States.

Geography 

Standing near the low valley of the Copper River, Mount Drum is notable for its large local relief. For example, its south face rises  over the head of the Nadina Glacier in only .
These numbers are comparable to better-known stratovolcanoes like Mount Rainier and Mount Shasta. However Mount Drum is somewhat overshadowed by its much higher neighbor Mount Sanford, which is also in Alaska.

Geology 

Mount Drum was active between 650,000 and 240,000 years ago. After the constructive phase, 
 ... paroxysmal explosive activity, probably from the central vent area, destroyed the south half of the stratovolcano and deposited ~7 km3 of hot and cold avalanche debris over an area >200 km2.
The effects of this explosive phase can still be seen in the particularly steep south face of Mount Drum above the Nadina Glacier.

Mount Drum is flanked on the west by the Shrub and Klawasi mud volcanoes. In historic times, the only activity in the vicinity of Drum has been mud and gas emitted from this group.

History

Naming 
Named in 1885 by Lieutenant Allen, U.S. Army, for Adjutant General Richard Coulter Drum (1825-1909), who entered the army in 1846, served in the Mexican–American War, participated in an expedition against the Sioux Indians in 1856, and became a Brigadier General during the American Civil War.

Climbing 

Mount Drum was first climbed on June 4, 1954 by noted Austrian mountaineer Heinrich Harrer, with Keith Hart and George Schaller, via the North Ridge. 
Heinz Allemann and Niklaus Lötscher made the second ascent on August 26, 1968, via the Southwest Ridge. The latter is the current standard route, and is rated  Alaska Grade 2+.

See also

List of mountain peaks of North America
List of mountain peaks of the United States
List of mountain peaks of Alaska
List of Ultras of the United States
List of volcanoes in the United States

References

Sources

External links

 
 
 

Landforms of Copper River Census Area, Alaska
Mountains of Alaska
Volcanoes of Alaska
Wrangell–St. Elias National Park and Preserve
Mountains of Unorganized Borough, Alaska
Volcanoes of Unorganized Borough, Alaska
Stratovolcanoes of the United States
Pleistocene stratovolcanoes